Riviera is an old term for the coast of Liguria, now used specifically for the French Riviera and the Italian Riviera.  For coastal areas popular with tourists that may be called rivieras, see Riviera.

Riviera may also refer to:

Places
French Riviera, in southeast France and Monaco
Italian Riviera, in Genoa's region, Italy
Turkish Riviera, in southwest Turkey
 Irish Riviera, a term used to refer to various locations in the United States with high population of Irish Americans
Portuguese Riviera, in Cascais/Estoril coast, Portugal
English Riviera, a nickname for Torbay in Devon and the surrounding area
Riviera (district), Switzerland
Riviera (Ticino), a municipality in Switzerland
Riviera, Gauteng, a suburb of Johannesburg, South Africa
Riviera, Texas, an unincorporated community
La Riviera, Sacramento County, California, a census-designated place
Riviera Ridge, Antarctica
1426 Riviera, an asteroid

In business
Riviera (nightclub), formerly outside of New York City in Fort Lee, New Jersey
Riviera (hotel and casino), former resort on the Las Vegas Strip
Riviera Holdings, the operator of the Riviera Casino
Riviera Broadcast Group, the owner and operator of three radio stations in the Phoenix, Arizona market
Riviera Line, a local English railway line that links Exeter with Torbay
 Riviera, a brand of cigarettes produced by Commonwealth Brands
Riviera, a model of guitar manufactured by Epiphone
Buick Riviera, an American luxury car built from 1963–1999
SIAI-Marchetti FN.333 Riviera, an Italian luxury flying boat
Disney's Riviera Resort, a European Riviera-themed Disney Vacation Club resort in Lake Buena Vista, Florida

Arts and entertainment

Film and television
Riviera (TV series), a British thriller series
Riviera, one of several names under which the film La spiaggia (1954) was released

Music
"Riviera" (song), a 1956 song
The Rivieras, a 1960s rock and roll band
 Jake Riviera, music producer

Other
Riviera (sculpture), a work by Anthony Caro formerly at Olympic Sculpture Park, Seattle, Washington, US
Riviera, VIT University, the annual international sports and cultural carnival of the Vellore Institute of Technology
Riviera: The Promised Land, a role-playing game for the WonderSwan Color, Game Boy Advance, and PlayStation Portable

Buildings in the United States
Riviera Apartments (Baltimore, Maryland), an apartment building on the National Register of Historic Places
The Riviera (Boston, Massachusetts), an apartment building on the National Register of Historic Places
Astro Theater, Omaha, Nebraska, originally named The Riviera, on the National Register of Historic Places
Riviera Theatre (North Tonawanda, New York), an entertainment venue on the National Register of Historic Places
Riviera Theatre, a concert venue in Chicago, Illinois

Ships
, a seaplane tender in the First World War, a trainer and transport in the Second, as well as a fast Cross-Channel steamer
, a cruise ship
SS Reina del Mar, a cruise ship later renamed Riviera

Other uses
Riviera Country Club, Pacific Palisades, California, notable for its golf course
Riviera Football League, an Australian rules football league (1986–2003)
Riviera MRT/LRT station, Singapore

See also
 Rivera (disambiguation)